Turkmenistan competed in the Olympic Games as an independent nation for the first time at the 1996 Summer Olympics in Atlanta, United States. Previously, the nation was part of the Unified Team at the 1992 Summer Olympics.

Athletics

Men
Field events

Key
Note–Ranks given for track events are within the athlete's heat only
Q = Qualified for the next round
q = Qualified for the next round as a fastest loser or, in field events, by position without achieving the qualifying target
NR = National record
N/A = Round not applicable for the event
Bye = Athlete not required to compete in round

Boxing

Judo

Shooting 

Turkmenistan has qualified a single shooter.

Men

Table tennis

Singles

Wrestling

Greco–Roman

References
Official Olympic Reports
sports-reference

Nations at the 1996 Summer Olympics
1996
1996 in Turkmenistani sport